Mescinia berosa is a species of snout moth in the genus Mescinia. It was described by Harrison Gray Dyar Jr. in 1914 and is known from Panama (including Rio Trinidad, the type location).

References

Moths described in 1914
Phycitinae